The 1976 WCT World Doubles was a tennis tournament played on indoor carpet courts in Kansas City, United States that was part of the 1976 World Championship Tennis circuit. It was the tour finals for the doubles season of the WCT Tour. The tournament was held from April 28 through May 2, 1976.

Final

Doubles

 Wojtek Fibak /  Karl Meiler defeated  Robert Lutz /  Ramsey Smith 6–2, 2–6, 3–6, 6–3, 6–4

World Championship Tennis World Doubles
1976 World Championship Tennis circuit
1976 in sports in Missouri